The Wise Guy is a 1926 American silent crime drama film produced and directed by Frank Lloyd and distributed through First National Pictures. Jules Furthman provided a screen story with scenario by Adela Rogers St. Johns. Mary Astor, James Kirkwood, and Betty Compson star.

Cast

Reception
Because the Kirkwood character was a criminal posing as an evangelistic minister who performs marriage and burial ceremonies, the film was found by the New York Board of Censors to be sacrilegious and banned from distribution unless remade. The Board was also concerned by the number of times the name of the Deity appeared in subtitles spoken by the fake minister. First National estimated the cost of resolving the Board's issues to be an additional $50,000 above the initial cost of $175,000.

Preservation
Previously considered lost, The Wise Guy is preserved at the National Archives of Canada.

References

External links

 Lobby card at gettyimages.com
Still at silentfilmstillarchive.com

1926 films
American silent feature films
Films directed by Frank Lloyd
First National Pictures films
American crime drama films
American black-and-white films
1920s rediscovered films
1926 crime drama films
Rediscovered American films
1920s American films
Silent American drama films